Eupithecia dilucida is a moth in the  family Geometridae. It is found in Cameroon, the Democratic Republic of Congo, Ethiopia, Kenya, Madagascar, Rwanda, Tanzania, Uganda and possibly South Africa.

References

External links
 pictures at boldsystems.org

Moths described in 1899
dilucida
Moths of Africa
Moths of Madagascar